The I. liga žien (Slovak for "First Women's League") is the top level women's football league of Slovakia.

The winner of the league qualifies for the UEFA Women's Champions League.

There are currently ten teams in the league.

History

The Czechoslovak women's football championships were divided between the country's two "federal republics", but the Czech and Slovak champions did meet in an annual final match from the season 1988–89 until 1992–93.

The Slovak Women's First League was founded in 1994.

Format
In 2011/12 the format of the league was changed. The ten teams first play a double round-robin for 18 matches per team. After that a championship group was introduced. The top four teams will play each other twice again. The winner of the group then is the champion. The last place of the regular season gets relegated.

2021/22 teams
Slovan Bratislava
MŠK Žilina
Spartak Myjava
FC Nitra
FC Petržalka
FC Spartak Trnava
AS Trenčín
FK Union Nové Zámky
MFK Dukla Banská Bystrica
MFK Ružomberok

List of champions 
List of champions:
1994-95 : Slovan Bratislava
1995-96 : Slovan Bratislava
1996-97 : Slovan Bratislava
1997-98 : Slovan Bratislava
1998-99 : Slovan Bratislava 
1999–2000: ŠKF VIX Žilina 
2000–01: Slovan Bratislava
2001–02: ZSNP Žiar nad Hronom
2002–03: ZSNP Žiar nad Hronom
2003–04: Slovan Bratislava
2004–05: Slovan Šaľa
2005–06: Slovan Šaľa
2006–07: Slovan Šaľa
2007–08: Slovan Šaľa
2008–09: Slovan Bratislava
2009–10: Slovan Bratislava
2010–11: Slovan Bratislava
2011–12: Slovan Bratislava
2012–13: Nové Zámky
2013–14: Nové Zámky
2014–15: Nové Zámky
2015–16: Slovan Bratislava
2016–17: Partizán Bardejov
2017–18: Slovan Bratislava
2018–19: Slovan Bratislava
2019-20: abandoned due to COVID-19 pandemic
2020–21: abandoned due to COVID-19 pandemic
2021–22: Spartak Myjava

References

External links
 
 Profille at soccerway.com

 
Top level women's association football leagues in Europe
1
Women
Women's sports leagues in Slovakia
Professional sports leagues in Slovakia